Bill Evans is a choreographer, performer, teacher, administrator, writer and movement analyst. More than 250 of Evans' works have been performed by professional and pre-professional ballet, modern dance and tap dance companies throughout the United States, including his own Bill Evans Dance Company, Repertory Dance Theatre, Concert Dance Company of Boston, Ballet West, Ririe-Woodbury Dance Company, Ruth Page Chicago Ballet, Pacific Northwest Ballet, North Carolina Dance Theater, Stars of American Ballet at Jacob's Pillow, Chicago Tap Theatre, Rochester City Ballet, FuturPointe Dance and many other companies. He has also created works for companies in Canada, Mexico and New Zealand.

Childhood and education
A native of Lehi, Utah, James William "Bill" Evans began his performing career during childhood, appearing regularly on the Juvenile Jamboree, a Salt Lake City television program in the 1950s. He studied tap and ballet in Salt Lake City with Charles Purrington and then June Purrington Park from 1948 through 1955. He began studying ballet and character dance with Willam Christensen (founder of the San Francisco Ballet and Ballet West) at age 15. He opened his own studio, the Bill Evans School of Dance in Lehi in 1957 and added branches in Sandy (1958) and Draper (1959). He also taught for the Utah Conservatory of Dance in Provo, Heber, Spanish Fork, Moroni and Nephi, Utah.

He graduated as salutatorian from Lehi High School in 1958. Throughout high school, he was active in the debate club (for two years he and his partners were undefeated in the state championship and the winners of the multi-state Weber College Invitation Tournament) and an actor in several school plays.

He was a scholarship student at the University of Utah, where he danced in Orchesis, directed by Shirley Ririe and Joan Woodbury and in the Utah Theatre Ballet (later named Ballet West), directed by Willam Christensen. He received a Bachelor of Arts (BA) Degree in English and a BA-equivalent in ballet, from the University of Utah in Salt Lake City in 1963.

He served for two years as an officer in the U.S. Army at Fort Knox, Kentucky, where he was printing control officer at the U.S. Army Armor School. During this time, he danced as a soloist with the Louisville Civic Ballet and took leading roles in musical theatre productions at the University of Louisville Belknap Theatre and the Iroquois Amphitheatre.

After the army, he moved to New York City, where he was a scholarship student at the Joffrey Ballet School and then a trainee at Harkness House for Ballet Arts. He returned to the University of Utah in 1967 and was awarded a master of fine arts degree in modern dance in 1970. His thesis, When Summoned, documented the creation of his ballet by that title for the Berlin Opera Ballet (West Berlin, Germany) in 1969.

He has studied Laban Movement Analysis since 1976 and is a Certified Movement Analyst by the Laban/Bartenieff Institute of Movement Studies in New York City and a Certified Laban Movement Analyst by the Integrated Movement Studies Program at the University of Utah.

Dance career
He first danced professionally in 1966, with the Briansky Ballet, based in New York City and Binghamton, NY and as a guest with the Washington (D.C.) Ballet and the Atlanta Ballet. After dancing with the Lyric Opera of Chicago (a966) and touring nationally with Ruth Page's Chicago Ballet (1067), he returned to Utah, where he joined the Repertory Dance Theatre in the spring of 1967. He remained with the company working full-time as a dancer, choreographer and one of three artistic coordinators through the spring of 1974. He has served on RDT's advisory board for many years and has returned often to choreograph new works, re-stage older works and/or teach company classes. He will create a new work for RDT's 50th anniversary in August, 2015.

In 1970, he founded the Bill Evans Solo Dance Repertory. He has continued to perform solo concerts throughout the years, and his work as a solo artist has taken him to 22 different countries. He will perform solo concerts to celebrate his 75th birthday in Winnipeg, Salt Lake City and Albuquerque in the spring, summer and fall of 2015.

In 1974, Bill Evans left Utah Repertory Dance Theatre to form his own professional ensemble, the Bill Evans Dance Company (BEDCO). In 1976, he moved BEDCO to Seattle, Washington. He also became artistic director of Dance Theatre Seattle/Bill Evans Dance Company School, at the time the largest school of modern dance in the Pacific Northwest. For several years, the Evans Company was among the most-booked dance groups in the United States, under the auspices of the Dance Touring and Artist in the Schools Programs of the National Endowment for the Arts.

As a solo artist and/or with the Bill Evans Dance Company, Mr. Evans has performed in all 50 U.S. states and many other countries. He has taught, performed and choreographed at the American Dance Festival and at the Jacob's Pillow Dance Festival. His company performed at the Spoleto Festival USA and in many festivals in Mexico and Europe.

He has choreographed more than 250 works. Some of his best-known pieces are: For Betty, Quartet for Jamie, Octet for Jacquie, Requiem for Janet, For Tim, The Legacy, Impressions of Willow Bay, Colony, Bach Dances, Tres Tangos, Jukebox, When Summoned, Tin-Tal, Five Songs in August, Yes Indeed, Los Ritmos Calientes, Velorio, Saintly Passion, Barefoot Boy With Marbles in His Toes, Climbing to the Moon, Albuquerque Love Song, Dreamweaver, Together Through Time, Rhythms of the Earth, Within Bounds, Hard Times, Craps, Naturescape Unfolding, Diverse Concerto, Multiple Margaret, Alternating Current, Prairie Fever, Doin' M' Best, Keep On Tryin', Remembering, Cuttin' A Rug, Field of Blue Children, Mixin' It Up, Double Bill Echoes of Autumn and Suite Benny. He has frequently collaborated with jazz musicians, including Bill Evans the famous jazz pianist—with whom he created Double Bill and Mixin It Up, in 1978 and 1979. Other famous collaborators have included ballerinas Cynthia Gregory and Christine Sarry.

In 1983, Evans became artistic director, resident choreographer and company teacher of Winnipeg's Contemporary Dancers, the oldest professional modern dance company in Canada. He was also artistic director of the Professional Program of the School of Contemporary Dancers. He has maintained an ongoing professional relationship with Winnipeg's School of Contemporary Dancers and has taught and choreographed for the Senior Professional Program at SCD annually for more than two decades.

In 1986, Evans became associate professor and director of contemporary dance at Indiana University, where BEDCO was in residence. He frequently returns to I.U. to teach, choreograph and/or perform.

In 1988, Evans joined the faculty at the University of New Mexico Theatre and Dance Department as Full Professor and Head of Dance. His company was based in New Mexico for 16 years, and performed frequently in Albuquerque, Santa Fe, Taos, Sandia Park and other communities, as well as on national and international tours.

In 1992, he founded the Bill Evans Rhythm Tap Ensemble. He founded the New Mexico Tap Festival and Dance Tap Jam in 1999.  
He returns regularly to Albuquerque to teach, perform and choreograph for the New Mexico Tap Dance Jam.

From 2004 through 2014, his company was based at The College at Brockport, State University of New York, where Evans was a visiting professor/guest artist. BEDCO performed regularly in Rochester, Buffalo and other communities in Western New York and elsewhere, including performances at the Jacob's Pillow Dance Festival in 2012 and 2013. BEDCO has appeared in the American Dance Guild Performance Festival in New York City five times since 2009. The Bill Evans Dance Company celebrated its 40th anniversary with performances in the Hochstein Performance Hall in Rochester in April, 2014. 

In August, 2014, Evans relocated to Providence, Rhode Island. In September of that year, he started a four-year relationship with the School of Dance at Dean College in Franklin, Massachusetts. He was both a full professor and an artist in residence, teaching 19 courses over four years and re-staging or creating seven choreographic works, and performing annually. The Bill Evans Dance Company was based Providence for four years.

In September, 2018, Mr. Evans moved one more time (his final relocation) to Port Townsend, Washington, where he has conducted numerous summer residencies since 1980. He founded the Evans Somatic Dance Institute in 2017, and it is now based at 670 Hudson Place, Port Townsend, where there is both a studio and an office. He has performed and will continue to perform for the next few years at the Madrona MindBody Institute and the Key City Public Theatre, both located in Port Townsend.

Teaching career
Evans has served as an assistant professor of Modern Dance at the University of Utah, a visiting professor of dance at the University of Washington and an associate professor of modern dance and coordinator of the Contemporary Dance Program at Indiana University. He is Distinguished Emeritus Professor of Dance at the University of New Mexico in Albuquerque, where he served as a full-time faculty member from 1988 to 2004. He is Visiting Professor Emeritus at The College at Brockport, State University of New York, where he served on the full-time faculty of the Department of Dance from August, 2014 through August, 2014. He served as a professor of dance or artist in residence at Dean College in Franklin, Massachusetts from August 27, 2014 through May 2018.

Method of Teaching Dance Technique
Evans has worked internationally in the field of somatics-based dance technique and began the integration of Laban Movement Analysis, Bartenieff Fundamentals and modern dance technique in 1976.

In 1977, he founded the Bill Evans Summer Institute of Dance in Seattle. Since that time, thousands of dancers have studied the Evans Technique is annual summer sessions in many cities in the U.S., Canada and Mexico. Since 1999, his summer programs have been primarily devoted to sharing his pedagogy of dance technique with dance educators. In 2002, he founded a Certification Program in the Evans Method of Teaching Dance Technique. Thousands of teachers have studied with Evans and his associates in annual summer programs in such locations as Port Townsend and Seattle, Washington; Albuquerque, Santa Fe and Las Cruces, New Mexico; Nanaimo and Winnipeg, Canada; Dallas and Fort Worth, Texas; Indianapolis and Bloomington, Indiana; Moraga, California; Puebla, Mexico; Brockport, New York City and Geneva, New York.

In 2003, Evans founded the annual Somatic Dance Conference and Performance Festival. Conferences/Festival have taken place at the College of Brockport (2013 and 2014), Dean College (2015) and Hobart and William Smith Colleges (2026, 2027, 2018 and 2019). An additional conference and performance festival, Dance Science and Pedagogy, took place at New Mexico State University in 2016.

Publications and Organizations
His book, Reminiscences of a Dancing Man: A Photographic Essay of a Life in Dance was published by the National Dance Association in 2005. He wrote a monthly column, 'Tips for Modern Teachers,' for Dance Studio Life for three years ending in December, 2014.

Published articles and book chapters include: Essential Evans, Dance Studio Life, 62 – 66, March/April, 2010: From the Heart, Dance Magazine, 210, January, 2010; Dance Education: Aliveness in the Present—Cultivating Openness to Continual (and Positive) Change, keynote address for the 2008 National Dance Association Pedagogy Conference at Saratoga Springs, published in a monograph—Focus on Dance Pedagogy: The Evolving Art of Teaching Excellence—by the National Dance Association, 88 – 96, 2009; Modern Marvels, Dance Teacher, 74, March 2008; Breath, Focus, Expression, Dance Magazine College Guide 2005 & 06, 41–42; Learning from Professional Dancers as a College Dance Major, Dancer Magazine, 32 - 33, May, 2005; Teaching Movement Analysis, J. Chazin-Bennahum (Ed.), Teaching Dance Studies, 1 – 17, 2005; We Must Provide Safe and Non-judgmental Support for our Lesbian, Gay and Transgender Students, Journal of Dance Education, 38 - 40, winter, 2004; Fully Alive, Dance Magazine College Guide 2004 & 05, 142 - 143; New Mexico Dance Pride. ABQ Arts, 4, December, 2003/January, 2004; How I Survived My Dance Training, Medical Problems of Performing Artists, 137 - 140, winter, 2003/2004; Fully alive, Dance Magazine, 44, October 2003; The multi-Colored Sky, Journal of Dance Education, 53–56, summer, 2003; Daniel Nagrin: A Strange Hero's Influence, Dance Magazine, 58–59, April 2002; Teaching What I Want to Learn [revised], Contact Quarterly, 43–51, summer/fall 1999; Teaching What I Want to Learn: NDA Scholar/Artist Lecture, American Association of Health, Physical Education, Research and Dance, March, 1997; Laban Movement Analysis as the Basis for Teaching Movement and Dance, Journal of Early Childhood Connections, 37-44 fall, 1995; East of Bombay, an American Dance Teacher, Performer and Choreographer Recaps his Journey to Western India. Dance Teacher Now, 40–50, July/August, 1995; Dancers in Cap and Gown, Dance Magazine, 56–58, July, 1995; In Today's Troubling World, Dance Can be a Tool for Kids [invited editorial], Albuquerque Tribune, March 8, 1990; I Had to Dance, Puget Soundings, 18–19, December, 1977.

He is currently publishing his collected writing (articles, keynote addresses and essays) on a website: www.evanssomaticdance.org.

The Legacy: Bill Evans, Reaching Out from the Regional Southwest, is a published videotape including a 23-minute interview of Bill Evans responding to questions asked by Jennifer Noyer and a special performance of The Legacy by the Bill Evans Dance Company, published by Harwood Academic Publishers, summer 2000. The videographer/editor is Rogulja Wolf. Jennifer Noyer wrote the accompanying book.

Mr. Evans has been the subject of feature articles in several national and international publications, including:  
Dance Teacher, July, 2010; Dance Teacher, March, 2008, February, 2007, October, 2003, October, 2001, and January, 2000; On Tap (publication of the International Tap Association), summer, 2007; Dance Studio Life (formerly Goldrush Magazine), May/June, 2007; Dance Magazine, January, 2007, October, 2003, April, 1990, and February, 1977; Experience (Centrum's Magazine for the Creative Life), summer, 2006; Albuquerque Arts, June 2004; Albuquerque Magazine, June 2004; Dance Spirit, April, 2000; Dance Teacher Now, May/June, 1993; Escenica, Mexico City,  September/October, 1992.

His biography is included in the International Dictionary of Modern Dance, 1998, pp. 245 – 250.

He is  a featured subject in:
The Dancer Within: Intimate Conversations with Great Dancers, by Rose Eichnbaum, published by Wesleyan University Press, 2008;
Seven Statements of Survival:  Conversations with Dance Professionals (Carolyn Carlson, Bill Evans, Garth Fagan, Deborah Jowitt, Joann Keali’Nohomoku, Madeleine Nichols and Andrea Snyder), edited by Renata Chilchowska, published by Dance and Movement Press, 2007;  
Will Modern Dance Survive?  Lessons to be Learned from the Pioneers and Unsung Visionaries of Modern Dance, written by Beth Soll, published by the Edwin Mellon Press, 2002.

He has served on the boards of directors of the National Dance Association, the National Dance Education Organization and the American College Dance Festival Association. He has served as an adjudicator at conferences of the American College Dance Festival Association since 1981 and for Regional Dance America on several occasions.

Awards and recognition
Evans has been the recipient of numerous grants and awards, including a Guggenheim Fellowship and thirteen fellowships and grants from the National Endowment for the Arts.

In 1997, he was selected as the National Dance Association Scholar/Artist. NDA published his keynote address, Teaching What I want to Learn. He gave subsequent keynote addresses at two NDA Pedagogy Conferences, one in Saratoga Springs, NY and the other in Las Cruces, NM.

In 2001, he received the New Mexico Governor's Award for Excellence and Achievement in the Arts. In 2004, he was selected, along with Savion Glover and Brenda Bufalino, as one of three favorite world tap dance artists in the Dance Magazine Readers' Choice Poll.

In 2005, Evans received the National Dance Education Organization's Lifetime Achievement Award. In 2009, he received the Dance Teacher Magazine Lifetime Achievement Award. In 2010, he was awarded an honorary doctorate of Fine Arts by the Cornish College of the Arts in Seattle. In 2011, he received the Outstanding Service Award from the National High School Dance Festival. In 2013, he was also made an honorary member of the International Association of Dance Medicine and Science. In 2014, he received a Lifetime Achievement Award from the American Dance Guild at the Ailey Citygroup Theatre in New York City. In 2015, he received the Choreography Fellowship from the Rhode Island State Council on the Arts. In 2017, the Bill Evans Dance Company received the Dorry Award for Providence's Best Dance Performance of the Year.

In 2013, Evans served as a Fulbright Program Specialist in a two-part residency (January and July) in Guatemala, City, Guatemala, under the auspices of Universidad Rafael Landivar and ArteCentro. In 2017, Mr. Evans completed a Fulbright Specialist residency, at Universidad Nacional in Heredia, Costa Rica.

His choreographic works have been selected for gala performances at numerous regional conferences of the American College Dance Festival Association, and at three of the ACDFA National Festivals.

Notes

Reviews and articles
 Rochester City Newspaper article by Casey Carlsen, November 26, 2008

External links
 http://www.evanssomaticdance.org 
 Bill Evans Dance website
 Seattle Modern Dance: The Legacy of Bill Evans, symposium, September 30, 2007 

American contemporary dancers
Dance teachers
American choreographers
University of New Mexico faculty
University of Utah alumni
Living people
Year of birth missing (living people)